The Khuman Lampak Main Stadium is a multi-use stadium located in Imphal, Manipur, India. It is used mostly for football and athletics, and host matches of Manipur State League. The stadium holds 35,285 people and was built in 1999. This stadium lies inside the Khuman Lampak Sports Complex. The stadium's record attendance was set in a football match between NEROCA FC and Indian Arrows (2–1; 2017–18 I-League season), with 35,285 people in attendance (5 January 2018).

Stadium

The stadium is a one tier stadium with roofing only on the main stand.

History

Upgrade
On 25 May 2011, it was announced that the stadium would get floodlights added along with a new turf.

Football matches
The Khuman Lampak Main Stadium  hosts the home games of the local clubs NEROCA and TRAU who play in the I-League. The Imphal Derby gained fame in 2022 during the 131st edition of Durand Cup when competitive football returned to the stadium after COVID-19 pandemic in India. The Government of Manipur declared a half-holiday for all governmental and educational institutions in build-up to the match on 18 August, where NEROCA defeated TRAU by 3–1 in Group-C opener.

See also
 List of football stadiums in India

References

Football venues in Manipur
Athletics (track and field) venues in India
Buildings and structures in Imphal
Sports venues in Manipur
1999 establishments in Manipur
Sports venues completed in 1999
NEROCA FC
20th-century architecture in India